Two Worlds is a 1930 British war drama film directed by Ewald André Dupont and starring Norah Baring, John Longden and Donald Calthrop. It was made at Elstree Studios by British International Pictures. It was made as an MLV, with a separate German-language version Zwei Welten and the French Les deux mondes.

The film's art direction was by Alfred Junge.

The film is set during the First World War. The action takes place on the Eastern Front between Austria and the Russian Empire.

Cast
 Norah Baring as Esther Goldscheider  
 John Longden as Lt. Stanislaus von Zaminsky  
 Donald Calthrop as Mendel  
 Randle Ayrton as Simon Goldscheider 
 Constance Carpenter as Mizzi  
 C. M. Hallard as Col. von Zaminsky  
 Jack Trevor as Captain Stanislaus  
 Andrews Engelmann as Lieutenant  
 Gus Sharland as Major  
 Boris Ranevsky as Ensign  
 Georges Marakoff as Colonel  
 John Harlow as Corporal

References

Bibliography
 Wood, Linda. British Films, 1927-1939. British Film Institute, 1986.

External links

1930 films
British war drama films
1930s war drama films
Films directed by E. A. Dupont
Films shot at British International Pictures Studios
World War I films set on the Eastern Front
Films about Jews and Judaism
British multilingual films
Films with screenplays by Franz Schulz
British black-and-white films
1930 multilingual films
1930 drama films
1930s English-language films
1930s British films